Halicampus brocki, the tasselled pipefish, or Brock's pipefish, is a species of marine fish of the family Syngnathidae. It is found in the Indo-Pacific, from southern Japan, Guam and the Marshall Islands to the central east and west coasts of Australia. This species is ovoviviparous, with males carrying eggs and giving birth to live young.

Etymology
The specific name honours Vernon E. Brock who was the Director of the Fish and Game Department in Honolulu.

Identification

This species can be identified by its slender body, long, branched filaments on the head, and short skin flaps on the body. It is whitish, yellowish, or pale brown, often with brown bars on the snout and pale bars on the body.

References

brocki
Marine fish
Taxa named by Earl Stannard Herald
Fish described in 1953